Ee Puzhayum Kadannu is a 1996 Malayalam-language romantic-thriller drama film directed  by Kamal and starring Dileep  and Manju Warrier. The film was a box office hit. The film was remade in Telugu as Pelli Peetalu, in Tamil as Kanna Unnai Thedukiren and in Kannada as Sambhrama.

Plot
Anjali (Manju Warrier) is the third daughter of a late music teacher. She lives with her two elder sisters Ashwathy (Mohini), Aarthi (Chippy) and grandmother (Lekshmi Krishnamurthy). Her life changes when Gopi (Dileep) moves to his brother's (N. F. Varghese) house as her neighbor. They fall in love. However, she has a problem with their marriage since she has two elder unmarried sisters. Gopi finds a groom for Ashwathy, but the marriage was called off as she is mute and deaf. After two failed attempts to get her married, they all feel hopeless when out of the blue Gopi's friend (Biju Menon) admits that he loves Ashwathy, and so Gopi helps him marry her. Then they try to get Aarthi married, but she admits to never having gotten over her old boyfriend. They then track him down and ask him to marry her. He admits to liking her, but says that his mother would ask for a lot of dowry. Gopi does everything he can, including making his brother loan out his house in order to obtain the money and the ornaments they demanded, which were provided by Aarthi's boyfriend himself.

However, that night, when their drunkard step-brother (Meghanathan) steals the ornaments from Anjali's house, Gopi finds him and accidentally kills him. He confesses to Anjali that he killed him, but they hide this until Aarthi's wedding is finished. Eventually Gopi is arrested in front of the wedding guests. 

After five years, when Gopi comes back from jail, Anjali and her whole family are waiting for him, and the movie ends on a positive note.

Cast
 Dileep as Gopi, a watch repairer; a neighbour of Anjali who falls in love with her
 Manju Warrier as Anjali, the youngest of three sisters who meets and falls in love with Gopi; a salesgirl
 Biju Menon as Unni, Gopi's friend, who secretly loves Anjali's mute and deaf sister
 Mohini as Ashwathy, the eldest of three sisters who is mute and deaf; an artisan
 Chippy as Aarathi, middle of three sisters who has a boyfriend
 Lekshmi Krishnamoorthy as Manthottathil Maheshwari Amma, Grandmother of the three sisters
 Sudheesh as Satheshan, Aarthi's boyfriend
 Harisree Ashokan as Ramankutty, Gopi's best friend
 Meghanathan as Raghu, step-brother of the three sisters; a drunkard
 N. F. Varghese as Sukumaran, Gopi's elder brother
 Reena as The deceased mother of the three sisters.
 Bindu Panicker as Bharathi, Gopi's sister-in-law
 Baby Neethu Praveen as Sukumaran’s (N F Varghese) and Bharathi’s (Bindu Panicker) daughter.
 Oduvil Unnikrishnan as Achuthan Nair, uncle of the three sisters
 Remadevi
 Shilpa Punnoose as Young Aswathy

Soundtrack

The movie has melodious songs composed by Johnson, with lyrics by Gireesh Puthenchery.

Box office
The film became a commercial success.

Awards
Manju Warrier won both Kerala State Film Award for Best Actress &  Filmfare Award for Best Actress – Malayalam for portraying her role Anjali' in this film.

References

External links
 

1990s Malayalam-language films
1996 films
1990s thriller drama films
Films scored by Johnson
Indian thriller drama films
Films shot in Thrissur
Films shot in Ottapalam
Films shot in Palakkad
Malayalam films remade in other languages
Films directed by Kamal (director)
1996 drama films